Phycoerythrobilin is a red phycobilin, i.e. an open tetrapyrrole chromophore found in cyanobacteria and in the chloroplasts of red algae, glaucophytes and some cryptomonads. Phycoerythrobilin is present in the phycobiliprotein phycoerythrin, of which it is the terminal acceptor of energy. The amount of phycoerythrobilin in phycoerythrins varies a lot, depending on the considered organism. In some Rhodophytes and oceanic cyanobacteria, phycoerythrobilin is also present in the phycocyanin, then termed R-Phycocyanin. Like all phycobilins, phycoerythrobilin is covalently linked to these phycobiliproteins by a thioether bond.

References

External links 
Chemical Structure of phycoerythrobilin

Tetrapyrroles
Photosynthetic pigments
Fluorescent dyes